Macalla nebulosa is a species of snout moth in the genus Macalla. It was described by Schaus in 1912. It is found in Costa Rica.

References

Moths described in 1912
Epipaschiinae